Tales of the Tooth Fairies (French: Souris Souris) is a children's television programme created by Françoise Caspan. It was co-produced by Siriol Productions, La Fabrique, EVA Entertainment, Cologne Cartoon, and Sofidoc S.A. for WDR and France 3. In the United Kingdom, it was aired on BBC One from 7 September until 14 December 1993, along with Noddy's Toyland Adventures and BBC Two on 20 October 1994.

Plot 
In the series, Gisele and Martin are "tooth mice": mice who perform the duties of tooth fairies. When a child in need loses a milk tooth, the  two mice (assisted by their friend Arthur), retrieve the tooth and give the child a fitting gift. This they do on orders from their Queen Elisa.

Characters
Gisele (Voiced by Sally Ann Marsh) - One of the tooth mice. She's usually the one to collect a tooth and slip a present under a pillow.
Martin (Voiced by Mathonwy Reeves) - Gisele's partner. He's usually the one to throw a grappling hook and line for Gisele to climb on.
Arthur (Voiced by David Kelly) - A cormorant and the two mice's helper who gives them rides and prevents anyone from interfering with their job.
Queen Elisa (Voiced by Penelope Keith) - The bossy and snappy queen of the Milk Teeth Kingdom. She decides what fitting presents Gisele and Martin must exchange for milk teeth.
Roland Rat - A thieving nuisance who likes to steal the two mice's presents for himself, but is always thwarted.
Romuald the Reindeer (Voiced by Nigel Planer) -

Episodes

Availability
VHS - "Tales of the Tooth Fairies: Mission Toothbrush"
VHS - "Crayola Presents Tales of the Tooth Fairies VHS"

References

External links

British children's animated adventure television series
French children's animated adventure television series
German children's animated adventure television series
Chinese children's animated adventure television series
1993 British television series debuts
1993 British television series endings
1993 French television series debuts
1993 French television series endings
1993 German television series debuts
1993 German television series endings
1993 Chinese television series debuts
1993 Chinese television series endings
BBC children's television shows
English-language television shows
French-language television shows
German-language television shows
Chinese-language television shows
1990s French television series
1990s British television miniseries
Animated television series about mice and rats
Tooth fairies